Televen is a Venezuelan television, transmitting educational programs, soap operas, sports, news and variety shows. The following is a list of programs broadcast by Televen.

Current programs

Soap operas

Programming

Former

Telenovelas

11-11: En mi cuadra nada cuadra (2014)
 5 Viudas Sueltas (2013)
 Alguien te mira (2010–11)
 Amor azul (2013)
 Apuestale a la vida (2014)
 Las Bandidas (2013)
 Como aman los hombres (2014)
 Corona de Lágrimas (2013)
 Corazón valiente (2012–13)
Cuento de otoño (2014-2015)
 Destino (2013)
 En nombre del honor  (2011–12)
 Escándalos
 Flor Salvaje (2011)
 Gabriela (2013–14)
La impostora (2015-2015)
 Una Maid en Manhattan (2012–13)
 Marido en alquiler (2013–14)
 Mi corazón insiste en Lola Volcán (2012–13)
 Mi prima Ciela (2014-2015)
 Mis 3 Hermanas (2014)
 La mujer del Vendaval (2014-2015)
 Nora (2014)
 La otra cara del alma (2013)
 Pan, amor y sueños (2013)
 Para volver a amar (2015-2015) 
 Pasión prohibida (2013)
 Pobres Rico (2013)
 Por Ella Soy Eva (2013)
 Primera dama (2011)
 Un refugio para el amor (2013)
 Rosa diamante (2013)
 El rostro de la venganza (2013)
 Santa Diabla (2013–14)
 Las santísimas (2013–14)
 Sonata de invierno (2013)
 La Tormenta (2013–14)
 Las Vega's (2014)
 La virgen de la calle (2013)

References

External links 

Televen
Televen
Venezuelan television series